Melanie Bruce (born 22 January 1972) is an English former ice dancer who represented Great Britain. Competing together with Andrew Place, she won the 1992 British national title. They finished 17th at the 1992 European Championships in Lausanne, Switzerland; 17th at the 1992 Winter Olympics in Albertville, France; and 19th at the 1992 World Championships in Oakland, California, United States.

Earlier in her career, she skated with Paul Knepper.

Results

With Place

With Knepper

References

English female ice dancers
1972 births
Olympic figure skaters of Great Britain
Figure skaters at the 1992 Winter Olympics
Living people
Sportspeople from London